Ceratocephala is a trilobite genus in the family Odontopleuridae.

References

External links 

Odontopleurida genera
Odontopleuridae
Ordovician trilobites of Europe
Paleozoic life of Newfoundland and Labrador
Paleozoic life of the Northwest Territories